The Harmon Der Donnerschlag is an American homebuilt aircraft that was designed and produced by Harmon Engineering of Howe, Texas. The aircraft was intended for amateur construction.

Design and development
Der Donnerschlag features a wire-braced shoulder-wing, a single-seat open cockpit, fixed landing gear and a single engine in tractor configuration.

The aircraft's  span wing has two beam-type spars and employs a 16% airfoil at the wing root, tapering to a 12% airfoil at the wingtip. The standard engine used is the  Volkswagen air-cooled engine automotive conversion, driving a two-bladed wooden propeller.

The aircraft was later developed into the Harmon Mister America.

Operational history
By October 2013 there were no examples registered in the United States with the Federal Aviation Administration and none may exist anymore.

Specifications (Der Donnerschlag)

References

Der Donnerschlag
1960s United States sport aircraft
Single-engined tractor aircraft
Homebuilt aircraft
Shoulder-wing aircraft